The 1978 United States Senate elections were held on November 7, in the middle of Democratic President Jimmy Carter's term. The 33 seats of Class 2 were contested in regular elections. Special elections were also held to fill vacancies. Thirteen seats changed hands between parties, resulting in a net gain of three seats for the Republicans. Democrats nevertheless retained a 58–41 majority.

Results summary

Source: Clerk of the United States House of Representatives

Gains, losses, and holds

Retirements
Five Republicans and five Democrats retired instead of seeking re-election.

Defeats
Three Republicans and seven Democrats sought re-election but lost in the primary or general election.

Change in composition

Before the elections

After the elections

Race summary

Special elections during the 95th Congress 
In these special elections, the winner was seated during 1978 or before January 3, 1979; ordered by election date, then state.

Elections leading to the next Congress 
In these general elections, the winners were elected for the term beginning January 3, 1979; ordered by state.

All of the elections involved the Class 2 seats.

Closest races 
9 races had a margin of victory under 10%:

Oklahoma was the tipping point state with a margin of 32.6%.

Alabama 

There were two elections in Alabama, due to the death of senator Jim Allen.

Alabama (regular) 

Democrat John Sparkman retired and was succeeded by Howell Heflin, the former Chief Justice of the Supreme Court of Alabama. Heflin, the Democratic candidate, faced no Republican opponent in the general election, defeating Prohibition Party nominee Jerome B. Couch.

Alabama (special) 

Following the death of senator Jim Allen, his widow Maryon was appointed by governor George Wallace to fill the vacancy until a special election could be held.  In this election, Democratic state senator Donald W. Stewart defeated former Republican Congressman James D. Martin to serve the remaining two years of the term.

Alaska 

Republican Ted Stevens won reelection to a second full (his third total) term, defeating Democrat Donald Hobbs.

Arkansas 

Following the death of senator John L. McClellan, then Kaneaster Hodges Jr. was appointed by governor David Pryor to fill the vacancy until a special election could be held. In this election, Democratic state governor David Pryor defeated former Republican challenger Thomas Kelly Jr. to serve the six years term.

Colorado 

Democrat Floyd Haskell decided to run for re-election to a second term, but was defeated by William L. Armstrong, the Republican nominee and the U.S. Representative.

Delaware 

Democratic United States senator Joe Biden won re-election to a second term, defeating Republican challenger James H. Baxter Jr., the Delaware Secretary of Agriculture.

Georgia 

Democrat Sam Nunn won re-election to a second term.

Idaho 

Republican James A. McClure was elected to a second term in office.

Illinois 

Republican Charles H. Percy ran for re-election to a third term in the United States Senate. Percy was opposed by Democratic nominee Alex Seith (D), attorney and former member of the Cook County Zoning Board of Appeals. Though Percy had been expected to coast to re-election over Seith, a first-time candidate, the election quickly became competitive. In the last few days of the campaign, a desperate Percy ran a television advertisement that featured him apologizing and acknowledging that, "I got your message and you're right." Percy's last-ditch effort appeared to have paid off, as he was able to edge out Seith to win what would end up being his third and final term in the Senate.

Iowa 

Democrat Dick Clark decided to run for re-election to a second term, but was defeated by Roger Jepsen, the Republican nominee and former Lieutenant Governor of Iowa.

Kansas 

Republican James B. Pearson retired and was succeeded by Nancy Kassebaum, the daughter of Alf Landon, defeating Democratic nominee William R. Roy, the former U.S. Representative. Roy also lost to Bob Dole in the 1974 election for Kansas' other Senate seat.

Kentucky 

Democrat Walter Huddleston was re-elected to a second term.

Louisiana 

Democrat J. Bennett Johnston won re-election to unopposed and his second term.

Maine 

Democrat William Hathaway decided to run for re-election to a second term, but was defeated by William Cohen, the Republican nominee and the United States Congressman from Maine's 2nd congressional district and Hayes Gahagan, former Maine State Senator

Massachusetts 

Republican Edward Brooke was defeated by Democratic Congressman Paul E. Tsongas.

Michigan 

Republican Robert P. Griffin ran for re-election to a third term, but was defeated by the Democratic candidate, and former Detroit City Council President Carl Levin.

Minnesota 

There were two elections in Minnesota, due to the death of Hubert Humphrey.

Minnesota (regular) 

Democrat Wendell Anderson was defeated by Republican challenger businessman Rudy Boschwitz.

In 1978, all three key statewide races in Minnesota were up for election—the Governorship, and both Senate Seats (the other Senate seat belonged to Hubert Humphrey, who died in 1978). But, there was a particular oddity to the three races—all three had incumbents who were never elected to the office in the first place. This became a well played issue by the Republicans—a billboard put up across the state read, "The DFL is going to face something scary -- an election".

When Walter Mondale ascended to the Vice Presidency in 1976, sitting Governor Wendell Anderson appointed himself to the open seat. This act did not sit well with the electorate. Plywood magnate Rudy Boschwitz campaigned as a liberal Republican and spent freely of his own money, but all that seemed to really matter was that he was neither a DFLer or Wendell Anderson in an election cycle where both were rejected by the voters. The end result was not even close—the challenger Boschwitz won in a 16-point landslide as all three statewide offices switched into Republican hands.

Minnesota (special) 

Incumbent Muriel Humphrey retired. Democratic candidate Bob Short was defeated by Republican candidate David Durenberger.

In 1978, all three key statewide races in Minnesota were up for election—the Governorship, and both Senate Seats (the other Senate seat belonged to Wendell Anderson, who, as Governor of Minnesota, appointed himself to fill the seat vacated by Walter Mondale, when Mondale ascended to the Vice Presidency in 1976). But, there was a particular oddity to the three races—all three had incumbents who were never elected to the office in the first place. This became a well played issue by the Republicans: a billboard put up across the state read, "The DFL is going to face something scary — an election".

When Hubert H. Humphrey died in office in January 1978, sitting Governor Rudy Perpich appointed Humphrey's widow, Muriel to sit until a special election could be held later that year. However, Muriel Humphrey opted not to seek election to the seat in her own right, and the DFL nominated former Texas Rangers owner Bob Short to run in the subsequent special election. The Independent-Republicans, on their part, nominated the liberal Republican David Durenberger, creating an unusual race in which the DFL candidate was positioned to the right of the Independent-Republican candidate. In addition to the general sense of dissatisfaction voters felt for the DFL, the DFL also had to contend with a large number of liberal members of the DFL, who were dissatisfied with Short's positions on hot button issues such as abortion, motorboat usage in the Boundary Waters Canoe area, and government spending, crossing party lines to vote for Durenberger. As a result, Durenberger won in a 26.9-percent landslide as the governorship and both U.S. Senate seats switched into Republican hands.

Mississippi 

Democrat James Eastland retired. Republican Thad Cochran won the open seat over Democrat Maurice Dantin, former District Attorney and Independent Charles Evers, Mayor of Fayette.

Evers was the first African American elected since the Reconstruction era to be mayor in any Mississippi city in 1969. He ran as an independent, and as a result his campaign divided the Democrats and allowed Cochran to win the senate seat with a 45 percent plurality. This made him the first Republican in a century to win a statewide election in Mississippi for any office except US President. Eastland resigned on December 27, 1978 to give Cochran a seniority advantage over new incoming senators.

Montana 

Following the death of senator Lee Metcalf on January 12, 1978, Montana Supreme Court Chief Justice Paul G. Hatfield was appointed to serve for the remainder of Metcalf's term. Hatfield opted to run for a full term in office, but was overwhelmingly defeated in the Democratic primary by Congressman Max Baucus of the 1st congressional district. Baucus advanced to the general election, where he was opposed by Larry R. Williams, an author and the Republican nominee. Baucus ended up defeating Williams by a solid margin to win his first term in the Senate, and, following Hatfield's resignation on December 12, 1978, he began serving his first term in the Senate.

Nebraska 

Republican Carl Curtis retired instead of seeking a fifth term. In the elections, Democratic nominee J. James Exon won the open seat over Republican Donald Eugene Shasteen.

New Hampshire 

Incumbent Democrat Thomas J. McIntyre decided to run for re-election to a fourth term, but was defeated by Gordon J. Humphrey, the Republican nominee also a professional pilot and conservative activist.

New Jersey 

Republican Clifford P. Case narrowly lost renomination to anti-tax conservative Jeff Bell, but the Democratic nominee, former professional basketball player Bill Bradley, easily won the general election.

New Mexico 

Republican senator Pete Domenici successfully ran for re-election to a second term, defeating Democrat Toney Anaya, Attorney General of New Mexico.

North Carolina 

The general election was fought between the Republican Incumbent Jesse Helms and Democrat John Ingram.  Helms won re-election, by a slightly wider margin than in 1972.

Jesse Helms won the Republican Party's nomination unopposed.

Oklahoma 

Republican Dewey F. Bartlett retired instead of seeking a second term due to his declining health. In the elections, Democratic nominee David Boren won the open seat over Republican Robert B. Kamm.

Bartlett died 2 months after leaving the U.S Senate

Oregon 

Republican senator Mark Hatfield successfully ran for re-election to a third term, defeating Democrat Vernon Cook, State Legislator and candidate for U.S. Representative in 1970 and 1974.

Rhode Island 

Democrat Claiborne Pell successfully sought re-election, defeating Republican James G. Reynolds.

South Carolina 

Popular incumbent Republican Strom Thurmond defeated Democratic challenger Charles D. Ravenel.

The South Carolina Democratic Party held their primary for governor on June 13, 1978.  Charles D. Ravenel, an unsuccessful candidate in the 1974 gubernatorial contest, originally planned to run for governor again in 1978, but was convinced by Vice President Walter Mondale in 1977 to run for senator.  He garnered over 50% of the vote in the primary and avoided a runoff election.

Senator Strom Thurmond faced no opposition from South Carolina Republicans and avoided a primary election.

Thurmond generally ignored Ravenel on the campaign and refused to debate him.  When they did cross paths, Thurmond criticized Ravenel for never having held a political office.  Ravenel did not help his cause by his actions in the 1974 gubernatorial race when he refused to endorse the Democratic nominee after he had been disqualified.  This irritated many Democrats and they also accused him of being nothing more than a liberal New Yorker.  Age was beginning to become an issue with Thurmond, so to combat perceptions of old age, Thurmond often appeared with his children on the campaign trail.  While 1978 was generally a Democratic year, Thurmond was able to pull off a commanding victory over Ravenel.

South Dakota 

Incumbent Democrat James Abourezk retired instead of seeking a second term. In the elections, Republican Congressman Larry Pressler won the open seat over Democratic former Mayor of Rapid City Don Barnett, thus becoming the first Vietnam veteran to serve in the Senate

Tennessee 

Two-term popular incumbent Howard Baker, who had served as United States Senate Minority Leader since 1977, ran for reelection against first-time candidate and Democratic Party activist Jane Eskind.

In the August 3 Democratic primary Eskind won in an open primary against eight other candidates:

 Eskind - 196,156 (34.52%)
 Bruce - 170,795 (30.06%)
 Lee - 89,939 (15.83%)
 Boyd - 48,458 (8.53%)
 Bradley - 22,130 (3.90%)
 Heinsohn - 17,787 (3.13%)
 Foster - 10,671 (1.88%)
 Nyabongo - 7,682 (1.35%)
 Vick - 4,414 (0.78%)
 Write-in - 147 (0.03%)

In the Republican primary, also held August 3, Baker easily emerged as the winner:

 Baker - 205,680 (83.44%)
 Howard - 21,154 (8.58%)
 Boles - 8,899 (3.61%)
 Patty - 3,941 (1.60%)
 Seiler - 3,831 (1.55%)
 Trapp - 2,994 (1.22%)

Baker won with a 15-point margin in the general election, held on November 7:

Texas 

Republican incumbent John Tower won re-election to a fourth term over Democrat Bob Krueger, U.S. Congressman of Texas's 21st congressional district.

Virginia 

Incumbent William L. Scott retired. Former Secretary of the Navy Republican John Warner beat Attorney General of Virginia Andrew P. Miller.  Scott then resigned January 1, 1979 and Warner was appointed January 2, 1979 for early seniority purposes.

West Virginia 

Democratic incumbent Jennings Randolph won re-election to a fifth term over Republican Arch Moore, former Governor of West Virginia.

Wyoming 

Incumbent Republican Clifford Hansen retired instead of seeking a third term. In the elections, Republican nominee Alan K. Simpson won the open seat over Democrat Raymond B. Whitaker, an attorney from Casper and nominee for U.S. Senate in 1960.

See also
 1978 United States elections
 1978 United States gubernatorial elections
 1978 United States House of Representatives elections
 95th United States Congress
 96th United States Congress

Notes

References